The eighteenth election to Glamorgan County Council, south Wales, took place in April 1949. It was preceded by the 1946 election and followed by the 1952 election.

Overview
Labour's comfortable majority on the council, including the aldermanic bench, remained unchanged.

Boundary changes
There were no boundary changes at this election.

Candidates
Many candidates  were returned unopposed.

Among the Labour candidates returned unopposed was John Shea (Briton Ferry) who had been selected in a 'referendum' to succeed George Gethin, who had died some months before the election.

Outcome
Labour retained their majority as comfortably as in all previous elections, and captured both the Garw Valley ward and the Coedffranc ward from the Communists.

Results

Aberaman

Aberavon

Abercynon

Aberdare Town

Bargoed

Barry 
Dudley Howe had previously represented Cadoxton and gained the neighbouring Barry ward from Labour. However, Labour won Cadoxton for the first time against the new candidate.

Barry Dock

Blaengwawr

Bridgend

Briton Ferry

Cadoxton

Caerphilly

Cilfynydd

Coedffranc

Cowbridge

Cwm Aber

Cwmavon

Cymmer

Dinas Powys

Dulais Valley

Ferndale

Gadlys

Garw Valley

Glyncorrwg

Gower

Hengoed

Hopkinstown

Kibbor

Castell Coch

Llandeilo Talybont

Llanfabon

Llwydcoed

Llwynypia

Loughor

Maesteg, Caerau and Nantyffyllon

Maesteg, East and West

Mountain Ash

Neath (North)

Neath (South)

Newcastle

Ogmore Valley

Penarth North

Penarth South

Pencoed

Penrhiwceiber

Pentre

Pontardawe

Pontyclun

Port Talbot East

Port Talbot West

Porthcawl

Pontlottyn

Pontypridd Town

Penygraig

Porth

Swansea Valley

Tonyrefail and Gilfach Goch

Trealaw

Treforest

Treherbert

Treorchy

Tylorstown

Vale of Neath

Ynyshir

Ystalyfera

Ystrad

Election of Aldermen
In addition to the 66 councillors the council consisted of 22 county aldermen. Aldermen were elected by the council, and served a six-year term. Following the 1928 election, there were eleven Aldermanic vacancies, all of which all of which were filled by Labour nominees despite the protestations of their opponents.

The following retiring aldermen were re-elected:
Sidney Cadogan (Lab, Rhondda)
W.H. Davies (Lab, Gower)
Alfred Evans (Lab, Rhondda)
Rhys Evans (Lab, Treorchy)
Tom Evans (Lab, Pengam)
Daniel T. Jones (Lab, Ystalyfera)
W. Arthur Jones (Lab, Tonyrefail)
Evan Phillips (Lab, Caerphilly)
Rev W. Degwel Thomas (Lab, Neath)

The following new aldermen were elected:
H.J. Cook (Lab, Penarth)
Mervyn Payne (Lab, Pencoed)

By-elections
Eleven vacancies were caused by the election of aldermen.

Aberaman by-election

Abercynon by-election

Barry Dock by-election
Labour lost the by-election held following the re-election of Dorothy Rees to the aldermanic bench. The Labour candidate had been elected following Rees's original election as alderman three years previously and at the recent election had unsuccessfully contested the neighbouring Barry ward.

Glyncorrwg by-election

Hopkinstown by-election

Llandeilo Talybont by-election

Llanfabon by-election

Maesteg by-election

Pontardawe by-election

Port Talbot by-election

Tylorstown by-election

References

Bibliography

1949
1949 Welsh local elections
1940s in Glamorgan